Little Mink Lake is a lake in the Moira River and Lake Ontario drainage basins in Addington Highlands, Lennox and Addington County in Ontario, Canada. A Hydro One transmission line crosses over the west end of the lake.

There are two unnamed creek inflows at the east, and one unnamed creek primary outflow, at the west, towards Little Merrill Lake. Its waters flow via Merrill Creek, Partridge Creek, the Skootamatta River and the Moira River into the Bay of Quinte on Lake Ontario at Belleville.

See also
List of lakes in Ontario

References

Lakes of Lennox and Addington County